Cladolasma, is a genus of harvestmen belonging to the family Nemastomatidae. The genus contains 4 species. They are confined to China, Japan and Thailand.

Species
 Cladolasma ailaoshan Zhang, Zhao & Zhang, 2018 - China
 Cladolasma angka (Schwendinger & Gruber, 1992) - Thailand
 Cladolasma damingshan Zhang & Zhang, 2013 - China
 Cladolasma parvulum Suzuki, 1963 - Japan

References

External links

Harvestmen